"Farewell to Nova Scotia" is a popular folk song from Nova Scotia, Canada. It was adapted from the Scottish lament "The Soldier's Adieu" written by Robert Tannahill. It was written sometime before or during World War I and popularized in 1964 when Catherine McKinnon  used it as the theme song for the Halifax-based CBC TV program, Singalong Jubilee.

Catalogued as Roud Folk Song Index No. 384, both the tune and lyrics are public domain.

History 
The 1791 Scottish folk song "The Soldier's Adieu" was printed in 1803 in a Glasgow newspaper and attributed to Robert Tannahill.  Philip A. Ramsay's 1838 edition of The Works of Robert Tannahill. With Life of the Author printed the first stanza of the song. Then Alexander Whitelaw published it in the 1843 edition of The Book of Scottish Song. David Semple then published it in his 1874 edition of The Poems and Songs of Robert Tannahill.

Folklorist Helen Creighton first collected the song in 1933 from Annie (Bayers) Greenough in West Petpeswick, Nova Scotia.

A version of "The Soldier's Adieu" was also recorded in the 1940s in Quebec titled, "On the Banks of Jeddore".

The Quebec duo "Les Karrik" recorded a french version titled "La Chanson de l'Acadien" in 1971.

Renditions
The song has been covered, notably, by Tommy Makem, Gordon Lightfoot, Stan Rogers, The Irish Rovers, Ryan's Fancy, Harry Hibbs Paddy Reilly, Ian and Sylvia Tyson, Anne Murray, Touchstone, Stompin' Tom Connors, The Real McKenzies, Schooner Fare, Wicked Tinkers, Battlefield Band, Alex Beaton, Aselin Debison, Dan Zanes, Moist, Oisin, Sons of Maxwell, Na h-Òganaich, and Asonance. It is an ambient theme for the Canadian civilization in the game Sid Meier's Civilization VI: Gathering Storm.

Lyrics
Chorus:
Farewell to Nova Scotia, the sea-bound coast,let your mountains dark and dreary be.
for when I am far away on the briny ocean tossed,Will you ever heave a sigh or a wish for me?

1.
The sun was setting in the west,
The birds were singing on every tree.
All nature seemed inclined to rest
But still there was no rest for me.
Chorus

2.
I grieve to leave my native land,
I grieve to leave my comrades all,
And my aging parents whom I've always loved so dear,
And the bonnie, bonnie lass that I do adore.
Chorus

3.
The drums they do beat and the wars do alarm,
The captain calls, I must obey.
Farewell, farewell to Nova Scotia's charms,
For it's early in the morning and I'm far, far away.
Chorus

4.
I have three brothers and they are at rest,
Their arms are folded on their chest.
But a poor simple sailor just like me,
Must be tossed and turned in the deep dark sea.
Chorus

See also

Anthems and nationalistic songs of Canada

Notes

References

External links
GEST Songs of Newfoundland and Labrador - Lyrics, Score, MIDIs, and Videos to Farewell To Nova Scotia
Music and Lyrics to Farewell to Nova Scotia
Helen Creighton Folklore Society - Farewell to Nova Scotia / The Nova Scotia Song

Canadian folk songs
Canadian patriotic songs
Nova Scotia music
Songs about Canada
Songs about parting
Works of unknown authorship
Works about Nova Scotia